Serina is the name of a fictional character in the 1978 Battlestar Galactica television series.  Portrayed by Jane Seymour, Serina was a famous news reporter in the Twelve Colonies.  She and her son, Boxey, survived the attack on the colonies.  Serina has no direct analog on the reimagined Battlestar Galactica.

Battlestar Galactica
Serina was introduced as she was broadcasting coverage of the Peace Conference that was supposed to end the 1,000 yahren Cylon War. Her report was being filed from the surface of the planet Caprica, and her coverage continued during the first part of the sneak attack by the Cylons on the Colonies. 

She managed to escape the attack with her son, Boxey, but Boxey's pet daggit (dog) Muffit was lost. Serina's former husband (Boxey's father) was never present in the series, and it is not made clear whether he is alive or dead or when this may have happened. Serina subsequently met Captain Apollo on Caprica when he landed his Viper and brought his father Commander Adama to the surface. Later, after the human survivors left the Colonies in a ragtag fleet, Serina asked Apollo to help with Boxey, who was refusing to eat. Apollo and Boxey established a bond, as did Serina and Apollo.

Serina was on Carillon with Apollo, in the Galactica film and in the TV episode "Saga of a Star World."

Serina and Apollo quickly fell in love and were married (sealed) by Commander Adama in the subsequent two-part episode "Lost Planet of the Gods". As after the destruction, Serina volunteered to become a shuttle pilot. When a strange disease incapacitated most of the fleet’s fighter pilots, she and all other shuttle pilots were trained to fly a Colonial Viper, despite Apollo's strenuous objections. The first space combat with the almost untrained shuttle pilots against a small Cylon outpost was won with no losses. While accompanying Adama and Apollo during the exploration of Kobol, Serina was shot by a Cylon centurion in an ambush and later died with Apollo at her side aboard the Galactica. After her death, Apollo attempted to bury his grief over the loss by accepting as many high-risk missions as he possibly could, leading Lieutenant Sheba to accuse him, in "The Hand Of God," of having a death wish.

Early concept
In early drafts of Battlestar Galactica scripts, the character of Serina was actually named Lyra, and was a member of the Quorum of Twelve, rather than a journalist. She was intended to be an ongoing character. When Jane Seymour was chosen for the part, she wanted to be free to do films. The script was rewritten to have her die of pluton poisoning (the same poisoning that had destroyed a large part of the refugees's food supplies) in the pilot. Scenes to this effect were filmed and included in the first version of the pilot; however, after this was shown to test audiences, it was deemed too depressing. All scenes with Serina being weak, or ill, or her diagnosis, even the original ending scene in which she slipped out during a performance of the Colonial Anthem, presumably to die, were later edited out. Instead, Serina died in the second episode, "Lost Planet of the Gods."

Reimagining

Serina is one of the characters from the original Battlestar Galactica series that has no direct analog in the 2003 reimagined Battlestar Galactica, although a character named Boxey does appear as the son of the human envoy sent to the "meeting" with the Cylons each year (who was the first casualty in the new war).  

Jane Seymour was asked to play the role of Admiral Cain in the new series in 2005, but declined the part.

An amalgam analogue of Serina and Cassiopeia appears as Shevon, who has a daughter Paya who functions in a manner similar to Serina and Boxey in relation to Lee Adama, Captain Apollo's analog in the episode Black Market. This episode also guest starred Richard Hatch who played the original Captain Apollo and featured a scene where Hatch's character Tom Zarek gave Adama information that led to Shevon and Paya's rescue.

References

External links 
Serina at Battlestar Wiki

Battlestar Galactica (1978) characters
Fictional reporters